Camera Obscura is a 2015 Egyptian independent historic short film written and directed by Nour Zaki. Starring Khaled Abol Naga, the film depicts the story of Al Hazen (Al Hassan Ibn Al Haytham’s) discovery of image reflection while being held in prison.

Plot
Accused of madness and jailed, AL-Hassan Ibn-Al Haitham (AL HAZEN) battles to adapt to his captivity till he makes an unexpected discovery that will change the course of human history.

Awards

 Boston Global Film festival - Nominated
 Visionaria film festival- festival symbol

References

External links
 
 https://web.archive.org/web/20160701190003/http://eda2a.com/news/3/84529/%D8%A3%D8%A8%D9%88-%D8%A7%D9%84%D9%86%D8%AC%D8%A7-:-%D8%B3%D8%A3%D8%B3%D8%B9%D9%8A-%D9%84%D8%A5%D9%86%D8%AA%D8%A7%D8%AC-%D9%81%D9%8A%D9%84%D9%85-%D8%B9%D9%86%22%D8%A8%D9%86-%D8%A7%D9%84%D9%87%D9%8A%D8%AB%D9%85%22-%D9%84%D9%88-%D9%86%D8%AC%D8%AD%D8%AA-%22%D8%AF%D9%82%D9%8A%D9%82%D8%A9%22-%D8%A7%D9%84%D8%A3%D9%88%D8%B3%D9%83%D8%A7%D8%B1
 http://www.egypttoday.co.uk/entertainment/also/%D8%AE%D8%A7%D9%84%D8%AF-%D8%A3%D8%A8%D9%88%D8%A7%D9%84%D9%86%D8%AC%D8%A7-%D9%8A%D9%82%D8%B1%D8%B1-%D8%A5%D9%86%D8%AA%D8%A7%D8%AC-%D9%88%D8%AA%D9%85%D8%AB%D9%8A%D9%84-%D9%81%D9%8A%D9%84%D9%85-%D8%A7%D9%84%D8%AD%D8%B3%D9%86-%D8%A7%D9%84%D9%87%D9%8A%D8%AB%D9%85
 http://www.elcinema.com/work/2035633/
 http://www.masralarabia.com/%D8%B3%D9%88%D8%B4%D9%8A%D8%A7%D9%84-%D9%85%D9%8A%D8%AF%D9%8A%D8%A7/463507-%D8%B9%D9%85%D8%B1%D9%88-%D9%88%D8%A7%D9%83%D8%AF-%D9%81%D9%8A%D9%84%D9%85-%D9%84%D8%AE%D8%A7%D9%84%D8%AF-%D8%A3%D8%A8%D9%88-%D8%A7%D9%84%D9%86%D8%AC%D8%A7-%D8%AF%D8%A7%D8%AE%D9%84-%D8%A3%D9%88%D8%B3%D9%83%D8%A7%D8%B1-%D8%A7%D9%84%D8%B3%D9%86%D8%A9-%D8%AF%D9%8A

2015 short films
English films
British independent films
2015 independent films